Diquan Adamson (born 10 February 1994) is a Barbadian footballer who plays as a striker. He played at the 2014 FIFA World Cup qualification.

References

1994 births
Living people
Association football forwards
Barbadian footballers
Barbados international footballers
Place of birth missing (living people)
21st-century Barbadian people